Svein "Chrico" Christiansen (6 August 1941 – 25 November 2015) was a Norwegian jazz musician (drums), known from a number of recordings, and central on the Oslo Jazz scene.

Career 
Christiansen started early to play drums in various bands in the Oslo area like "Hot Saints" (1958–60), "Veitvet musikkskoles storband", and in ensembles led by Oddvar Paulsen, Roy Hellvin, Helge Hurum, Fred Nøddelund and Frode Thingnæs. He played on albums by Einar Iversen, Egil Kapstad, Karin Krog, Terje Bjørklund, Svein Finnerud/Trond Botnen, Terje Rypdal (Odyssey, 1975), Knut Riisnæs, Radka Toneff, Jon Eberson, Laila Dalseth, Øystein Sevåg, Jens Wendelboe, Susanne Fuhr, Dag Arnesen (Renascent, 1984), within "Out To Lunch", and with Bjørn Alterhaug and Helge Iberg.

He also appeared on records in other genres, with "Kjerringrokk" (1975), Svein Finjarn (Soloflight, 1978), "LASA" (Released, 1980), "Stiftelsen" (1981), Odd Børretzen (På den ene siden – På den andre siden, 1976) and Bjørn Eidsvåg (Live i Ny York 1981, Passe gal 1983), Jan Eggum (En natt forbi 1979, 30/30, 2005), Lars Klevstrand (Frie hender, 1981), Lystad/Mjøen, Ryfylke Visegruppe (Forlis, 1983) and Trond-Viggo Torgersen (Harunåsågirebort, 1978).

During the 1970s, he was also in Oslo-Filharmonien, "Radiostorbandet", Kringkastingsorkesteret (1980–2003) and "Per Nyhaug Studioband", and recently in "Willy Andresen Quartet", Einar Iversen Trio, trio with Dag Arnesen and Terje Gewelt, Totti Bergh Quintet, Tine Asmundsen Trio, Quartet and Quintet (1999–), as well as in the band "Bone Thang". He died in Oslo in 2015.

Honors 
Gammleng-prisen (1989) in the class "Studio Musician»

Discography (in selection) 

With Karin Krog & Friends
1968: Joy (Sonet)

With Øystein Sunde
1971: Det Året Det Var Så Bratt (CBS)
1976: På Sangens Vinger (Philips)

With Terje Rypdal
1975: Odyssey (ECM Records|ECM)

With Radka Toneff
1979: It Don't Come Easy (Zarepta)
2008: Set It Free - Et Portrett Av Radka Toneff (KRF)
2008: Butterfly (Curling Legs)

With Jan Eggum
1979: En natt forbi (CBS Records|CBS)
2005: 30/30 (Grappa Music)

With Bjørn Eidsvåg
1981: Live i Ny York (Kirkelig Kulturverksted)
1983: Passe gal (Kirkelig Kulturverksted)

With Jens Wendelboe Big Band
1984: Lone Attic (NOPA)
2012: Fresh Heat (Rosa Records)

Within The Norwegian Radio Big Band
1986: The Norwegian Radio Big Band Meets Bob Florence (Odin Records)
1989: The Norwegian Radio Big Band Meets Bill Holman (Taurus Records )

Within "Out To Lunch" – quintet with Bjørn Klakegg, Olaf Kamfjord, Rune Klakegg & Vidar Johansen
1988: Out To Lunch (Odin Records)
1995: Kullboksrytter (Curling Legs), with The Norwegian String Quartet & Sidsel Endresen

Within Svein Finnerud Trio
1994: Travel Pillow (Prisma Records)

With Dag Arnesen & Terje Gewelt – trio
1994: Movin (Taurus Records)
1998: Inner Lines (Resonant Music)

With Tine Asmundsen's «Lonely Woman»
2003: aLive (Hazel Jazz)
2005: Demon's Diversions (Hazel Jazz)
2008: Radegund (Hazel Jazz)
2012: Lovely Luna (Hazel Jazz)

With other projects
1976: På den ene siden – På den andre siden (Bare Bra Musikk), with Odd Børretzen
1981: Frie hender (Mai), with Lars Klevstrand

References

External links 
Christiansen, Svein – Biography from Norsk musikkinformasjon (in Norwegian)

1941 births
2015 deaths
Musicians from Kolbotn
20th-century Norwegian drummers
21st-century Norwegian drummers
Norwegian jazz drummers
Male drummers
Norwegian jazz composers
Male jazz composers
ECM Records artists
Taurus Records artists
20th-century drummers
20th-century Norwegian male musicians
21st-century Norwegian male musicians